Erik Gustaf Bratt (1 January 1916 – 13 February 2010) was a Swedish engineer and pilot. Erik Bratt was the brother of Colonel Lars Bratt.

Biography 
Erik Bratt was responsible for the construction of Saab 35 Draken and Saab 37 Viggen by Saab AB, Linköping Sweden. Bratt personified in Sweden the concept of the development and vast expansion of the Swedish Air Force in the shadow of the cold war and the nuclear arms race.

Personal 
Bratt took flight certificate 1937 and underwent flight training in the Swedish Air Force  from 1940 to 1942. He graduated in 1942 with a master's degree in engineering from the Royal Institute of Technology. He was employed at Skandinaviska Aero (later a part of Scandinavian Airlines) from 1942 to 1945 and from 1945 until his retirement in 1981 at Saab AB. In 1962 he became chief engineer, in 1964 became the head of the design department for aircraft and in 1974 director.

Saab 35 Draken and Saab 37 Viggen 
By Saab AB, Bratt was the leader of the construction team of Bertil Dillner, Hermann Behrbohm, Einar Bergström and Olof Ljungström. The project included as key parts development of supersonic flight and the delta wing concept.

 The client, the Swedish Air Force's desire (the Defence Act of 1958) in the 1950s to the 1970s was to swiftly attack strategic nuclear weapons-bombers such as Tupolev Tu-16 before they reached their targets. This with fast supersonic-delta wing-fighter aircraft such as Saab 35 Draken, where speed and preparedness were the key factors. 
 The Swedish Air Force's need were also landing operation-defenses over the surrounding seas with attack aircraft and ultra-fast reconnaissance aircraft planes such as the Saab 37 Viggen. 
 Economy and materials engineering for friction heat of the atmosphere set the limit for speed. This generated large orders to build a very large air force and resources for development.

Awards 
Bratt was awarded the Swedish Aeronautical Society's Thulin Medal in gold in 1972.

He was promoted in 1984 to technology honorary doctor at Linköping University and was awarded the 1986 Söderberg plaque. In 2002, he was appointed an honorary member of the Swedish Aviation History Association (Svensk Flyghistorisk Förening).

His autobiography is called Silvervingar (Silver Wings). (Bratt was a reserve pilot at the Swedish Air Force and received Silvervingar.)

See also 
 Delta wing
 Supersonic flight
 Saab 32 Lansen
 Saab 35 Draken
 Saab 105
 Saab 37 Viggen
 Tore Gullstrand

References 

1916 births
2010 deaths
Aircraft designers
Aerodynamicists
Saab aircraft
Swedish civil engineers